Metadasylobus is a genus of harvestmen in the family Phalangiidae.

Species
 Metadasylobus bolei Hadzi, 1973
 Metadasylobus echinifrons (Simon, 1879)
 Metadasylobus fuscoannulatus (Simon, 1883)
 Metadasylobus ibericus (Rambla, 1968)
 Metadasylobus instratus (L.Koch, 1867)
 Metadasylobus macedonicus Hadzi, 1973
 Metadasylobus pristes (L. Koch, 1867)
 Metadasylobus vorax (L. Koch, 1867)

References

Harvestmen
Harvestman genera